The list of shipwrecks in 1901 includes ships sunk, foundered, grounded, or otherwise lost during 1901.

January

3 January

7 January

8 January

10 January

11 January

14 January

16 January

17 January

18 January

19 January

20 January

26 January

28 January

29 January

Unknown date

February

3 February

4 February

5 February

6 February

12 February

15 February

16 February

19 February

20 February

21 February

22 February

25 February

Unknown date

March

1 March

3 March

8 March

14 March

16 March

17 March

19 March

21 March

22 March

26 March

28 March

29 March

April

1 April

2 April

5 April

7 April

8 April

10 April

13 April

17 April

19 April

20 April

21 April

22 April

23 April

24 April

May

10 May

11 May

12 May

14 May

18 May

21 May

24 May

25 May

27 May

29 May

June

1 June

2 June

4 June

7 June

8 June

11 June

12 June

14 June

17 June

18 June

23 June

26 June

28 June

29 June

30 June

Unknown date

July

4 July

5 July

6 July

12 July

13 July

15 July

16 July

18 July

20 July

24 July

25 July

26 July

29 July

August

3 August

4 August

6 August

7 August

8 August

12 August

14 August

15 August

18 August

19 August

21 August

23 August

24 August

25 August

26 August

27 August

28 August

30 August

Unknown date

September

3 September

4 September

8 September

15 September

16 September

18 September

19 September

20 September

23 September

24 September

26 September

October

2 October

4 October

6 October

7 October

10 October

13 October

14 October

18 October

19 October

20 October

22 October

26 October

29 October

November

2 November

4 November

6 November

7 November

9 November

10 November

13 November

14 November

16 November

19 November

20 November

22 November

23 November

24 November

27 November

28 November

29 November

30 November

December

1 December

3 December

4 December

7 December

8 December

9 December

13 December

15 December

17 December

18 December

19 December

21 December

23 December

25 December

29 December

31 December

Unknown date

Unknown date

References

1901
Maritime incidents in 1901
Ship